Stephen Carlton Bradley (4 April 1909 – 2 July 2003) was an Anglican bishop who served as presiding bishop of the Church of England in South Africa (now the Reformed Evangelical Anglican Church of South Africa) from 1965 to 1984.

Bradley was born in Cairo, Egypt, the son of missionaries with the Egypt General Mission. His family migrated to Australia when he was 9. Bradley studied at Sydney Church of England Grammar School and Moore Theological College and went to South Africa in 1935 as a missionary to Zulus.

During World War II, Bradley served first in the South African Army, and then in the Australian Army, serving as a chaplain. He returned to South Africa after the war and served in the Church of England in South Africa, being consecrated as Assistant Bishop of Cape Town in 1958. He was consecrated by Fred Morris, acting alone: this unusual act brought the charge that Bradley's consecration was irregular.

Bradley opposed the World Council of Churches, and supported apartheid.

References

1909 births
2003 deaths
Moore Theological College alumni
Reformed Evangelical Anglican Church of South Africa bishops
Australian Army chaplains
Australian Army personnel of World War II
South African Army personnel
South African military personnel of World War II
People educated at Sydney Church of England Grammar School
Clergy from Cairo